The extra-provincial Anglican churches are a group of small, semi-independent church entities within the Anglican Communion. Unlike the larger member churches of the Communion, extra-provincial churches are not part of an ecclesiastical province and are subject to the metropolitical oversight of the Archbishop of Canterbury or theoretically of another bishop.  there are five extra-provincial churches. In almost every case, these churches consist of just one diocese, although the Church of Ceylon is an exception, having two.

Under the metropolitical oversight of the Archbishop of Canterbury:
 The Anglican Church of Bermuda, led by the Bishop of Bermuda
 The Church of Ceylon, Sri Lanka, led by the Bishop of Colombo
 The Parish of the Falkland Islands, led by the Bishop of the Falkland Islands  (post currently held by the Archbishop of Canterbury himself)
 The Lusitanian Catholic Apostolic Evangelical Church (Igreja Lusitana Católica Apostólica Evangélica) in Portugal, led by the Bishop of the Lusitanian Church
 The Spanish Reformed Episcopal Church (Iglesia Española Reformada Episcopal) in Spain, led by the Bishop of the Spanish Reformed Church

 
Anglican Communion church bodies